Robert W. Fri (November 16, 1935 – October 10, 2014) was an American administrator who served as the Deputy Administrator of the United States Environmental Protection Agency from 1971 to 1973.

He died of lung cancer on October 10, 2014, in Bethesda, Maryland at age 78.

References

1935 births
2014 deaths
People of the United States Environmental Protection Agency
Rice University alumni
Harvard Business School alumni
People from Kansas City, Kansas